Love Moves is the seventh studio album by Kim Wilde, released in May 1990.

The album contained six tracks written by Ricki and Kim Wilde and four tracks written by Kim Wilde and Tony Swain. It was produced by Ricki Wilde.

Promotion began in the spring of 1990 with the release of the single "It's Here", a track with Spanish guitars.

The album attempted to capitalize on the success of Close, but although a Top 10 in Scandinavian countries, it failed to sell as strongly as its predecessor. Some critics noted the MOR feel of the album and the use of similar production sounds throughout. It includes guests Jaki Graham, who contributed backing vocals, and Deon Estus, playing bass guitar.  Wilde herself believed "it was a very strong album, and it was very disappointing that it didn't do well. But it didn't really come as too much of a big surprise, because my career before then had always been very up and down. So it wasn't a complete shock... but it was very disappointing."
 
This was the first Wilde project to yield no Top 40 releases in the UK ("Time", the second release, is the lowest charting single in her discography). Five singles in total were released across Europe, with "It's Here" becoming a Top 20 hit in Scandinavian countries and "Can't Get Enough" making a Top 20 entry and long run on the French singles chart.

In Australia, the album peaked at #126 on the ARIA albums chart.

Critical response
Love Moves received mostly negative reviews from contemporary critics. Colin Irwan of Smash Hits, despite referring to Wilde as "one of pop's more welcome survivors", accused the singer of "underselling" herself. Describing "It's Here" as "characterless" and the album itself as containing "featherweight production and unimaginative material", some praise was given to "Time" (which was compared to the work of Belinda Carlisle) and "In Hollywood" (featuring a "Madonna-esque sense of drama"). Q described the album as a disappointment, writing of Wilde's "character-free voice" and the "EEC approved variants of what once might have been considered a lightly soulful persuasion" found on "Time" and "Who's to Blame".

Track listing 
All tracks composed by Kim Wilde and Ricky Wilde; except where indicated.

"It's Here" - 3:36
"Love (Send Him Back to Me)" (Tony Swain) - 4:32
"Storm in Our Hearts" (Tony Swain) - 5:09
"World in Perfect Harmony" - 3:53
"Someday" - 4:49
"Time" - 4:11
"Who's to Blame" (Tony Swain) - 3:48
"Can't Get Enough (Of Your Love)" - 4:00
"In Hollywood" (Tony Swain) - 4:17
"I Can't Say Goodbye" - 5:01

Personnel 
 Kim Wilde – lead and backing vocals 
 Ricky Wilde – keyboards, programming 
 Tony Swain – additional keyboards (2, 3, 7, 9), additional programming (2, 3, 7, 9)
 Steve Byrd – guitars (1, 4, 8, 10)
 Deon Estus – bass (10)
 Danny Cummings – percussion (9)
 Richard Niles – string arrangements (10)

Production 
 Ricky Wilde – producer, mixing 
 Jimmy Jazz – engineer, mixing 
 Stephen Streater – assistant engineer 
 Three Associates (3a) – album design 
 Johnnie Rutter – photography

Charts

Certifications

References

1990 albums
Kim Wilde albums
MCA Records albums